The 2010 Atlantic 10 men's basketball tournament was played initially at campus sites for the first round on March 9, 2010, and subsequently at Boardwalk Hall in Atlantic City, New Jersey, from March 12th through March 14th, 2010.  The Temple Owls won the tournament and thereby received an automatic bid to the 2010 NCAA Men's Division I Basketball Tournament.

Seeding for the tournament was determined by the conference standings at the end of the regular season.  The last two teams in the standings did not qualify for the tournament.

Temple's victory was their third consecutive A-10 tournament championship.  They became the first team to win three straight since UMass won five consecutive titles from 1992 through 1996.

The championship game was nationally televised on CBS, the first time the league's championship game was broadcast by the network.  In years past, ESPN had televised the game.

Bracket

Asterisk denotes game ended in overtime.

References

Atlantic 10 men's basketball tournament
Tournament
Atlantic 10 men's basketball tournament
Atlantic 10 men's basketball tournament